TRU-SPEC (owned by ATLANCO, formerly Atlanta Army Navy Company) is a United States brand of clothing consisting of uniforms and tactical equipment for military, law enforcement and public safety personnel. In addition to TRU-SPEC's on-duty gear and apparel, the company also manufactures various types of off-duty clothing.

ATLANCO
 
ATLANCO's offices are located in Marietta, Georgia.

History
The Atlanta Army Navy Company was founded by the Zaglin family in 1950 as a military surplus retailer. It was renamed "ATLANCO" (an acronym for Atlanta Army Navy Company) in the late 1980s.

The brand name TRU-SPEC was later created, reflecting the fact that the uniforms the company manufactures met all of the U.S. Government's "true specifications" by using the United States mil-spec fabrics. The TRU-SPEC brand later expanded from core military apparel to public safety and law enforcement, as well as outdoor apparel.

Manufacturing
In 1996, ATLANCO opened its first manufacturing facility in Honduras under the company name "Basic Apparel". In 2004, it relocated to a 100,000-square foot facility in La Ceiba, Honduras. This facility allows the entire manufacturing process to be housed under one roof, with room for expansion. Currently, this factory supports over 900 employees. In 2009 the facility was ISO 9001:2008 and NFPA-certified, and thus enabled to manufacture fire retardant clothing.

ATLANCO now has strategic partnerships with manufacturers in Indonesia, Korea, China, and the Dominican Republic.

Products
Some of the TRU-SPEC brand products include:
BDUs
ACUs
Tactical pants
Uniforms
Cordura baselayer systems
Flight suits
Backpacks
Belts
Boots
Caps

Marketing

While ATLANCO has many civilian customers, its principal market consists of domestic and foreign military, police, fire, homeland security, and other public safety officials.

In 2011, actor and retired Marine drill instructor R. Lee Ermey became the official spokesperson for TRU-SPEC, and assisted in the design of a new line of tactically-inspired apparel.

5IVE STAR GEAR
TRU-SPEC's sister brand, 5IVE STAR GEAR, consists of military surplus, outdoor sports, camping, hunting, survivalist, and other rugged outdoor gear for the traditional ATLANCO customer.

References

Clothing brands of the United States
United States military uniforms
Law enforcement uniforms
Clothing manufacturers
Clothing companies established in 1950
Companies based in Atlanta
1950 establishments in Georgia (U.S. state)